The 1942 Louisville Cardinals football team was an American football team that represented the University of Louisville as a member of the Kentucky Intercollegiate Athletic Conference (KIAC) during the 1942 college football season. In their seventh and final season under head coach Laurie Apitz, the Cardinals compiled a 2–3 record. Louisville did not field a football team in 1943 or 1944 due to World War II

Schedule

References

Louisville
Louisville Cardinals football seasons
Louisville Cardinals football